memoQ is a proprietary computer-assisted translation software suite which runs on Microsoft Windows operating systems. It is developed by the Hungarian software company memoQ Fordítástechnológiai Zrt. (memoQ Translation Technologies), formerly Kilgray, a provider of translation management software established in 2004 and cited as one of the fastest-growing companies in the translation technology sector in 2012 and 2013. memoQ provides translation memory, terminology, machine translation integration and reference information management in desktop, client/server and web application environments.

History 

memoQ, a translation environment tool first released in 2006, was the first product created by memoQ Translation Technologies, a company founded in Hungary by the three language technologists Balázs Kis, István Lengyel and Gábor Ugray. In the years since the software was first presented, it has grown in popularity and is now among the most frequent TEnT applications used for translation (it was rated as the third most used CAT tool in a Proz.com study in 2013 and as the second most widely used tool in a June 2010 survey of 458 working translators), after SDL Trados, Wordfast, Déjà Vu, OmegaT and others. Today it is available in desktop versions for translators (Translator Pro edition) and project managers (Project Manager edition) as well as site-installed and hosted server applications offering integration with the desktop versions and a web browser interface. There are currently several active online forums in which users provide each other with independent advice and support on the software's functions as well as many online tutorials created by professional trainers and active users.
Before its commercial debut, a version of memoQ (2.0) was distributed as postcardware.

Configuration 

As of 2018, all supported memoQ editions contained these principal modules:
File statistics Word counts and comparisons with translation memory databases, internal content similarities and format tag frequency. memoQ was the first translation environment tool to enable the weighting of format tags in its count statistics to enable the effort involved with their correct placement in translated documents to be considered in planning. Another innovation introduced for file statistics was the analysis of file homogeneity for identifying internal similarities in a file or a group of files which might affect work efforts. Previously such similarities had only been identified in the form of exact text segment repetitions or in comparisons with translation unit databases (translation memories) from previous work.
File translation and editing grid A columnar grid arrangement of the source and target languages for translating text, supported by other information panes such as a preview, difference highlighting with similar information in reference sources and matches with various information sources such as translation memories, stored reference files, terminology databases, machine translation suggestions and external sources.
Translation memory management Creation and basic management of databases for multilingual (in the case of memoQ, bilingual) translation information in units known as "segments". This information is often exchanged between translation management and assistance systems using the file format TMX. memoQ is also able to import translation memory data in delimited text format.
Terminology managementStorage and management of terminology and meta information about the terminology to assist in translation or quality assurance. memoQ is able to import terminology data in TMX and delimited text formats and export it in delimited text and an XML format. memoQ also includes an integrated facility for statistical terminology extraction from a chosen combination of documents to translate, translation memory databases and reference corpora. The stopword implementation in the terminology extraction module includes special position indicators to enable blocked terms to be included at the beginning, in the body or at the end of multi-word phrases, which distinguishes this terminology extraction approach from most others available in this type of application.
Reference corpus management Also known by the trademarked name "LiveDocs", this is a diverse collection of information types, including aligned translations, bitext files from various sources, monolingual reference information in many formats and various types of media files as well as any other file types users choose to save for reference purposes. File types not known by the memoQ application are opened using external applications intended to use them. A distinguishing characteristic of bilingual text alignments in memoQ is automated alignment which need not be finalized and transferred to translation memory databases before it can be used as a basis for comparison with new texts to translate, and alignments can be improved as needed in the course of translation work. In practice this often results in much less effort to maintain legacy reference materials.
Quality assurance This is for verifying the adherence to quality criteria specified by the user. Profiles can be created to focus on specific workflow tasks, such as format tag verification or adherence to specified terminology.

There are also other supporting features integrated in the environment such as spelling dictionaries, lists of nontranslatable terms, autocorrection rules and "auto-translation" rules which enable matching and insertion of expressions based on regular expressions.

Supported source document formats 

memoQ 2015 supports dozens of different file types, including: various markup and tagged formats such as XML, HTML, XLIFF, SDLXLIFF (SDL Trados Studio's native format for translation), OpenDocument files; plain text files; Microsoft Word, Excel, and PowerPoint; and some Adobe file formats, such as PSD, PDF and InDesign. To know more about supported formats and languages in memoQ, see this link: Languages and file formats.

Handling of translation memories and glossaries 

The translation memory (TM) format of memoQ is proprietary and stored as a group of files in a folder bearing the name of the translation memory. External data can be imported in delimited text formats and Translation Memory eXchange format (TMX), and translation memory data can be exported as TMX. memoQ can also work with server-based translation memories on the memoQ Server or, using a plug-in, other external translation memory sources. memoQ Translation memories are bilingual.

In translation work, translation segments are compared with translation units stored in the translation memory, and exact or fuzzy matches can be shown and inserted in the translated text.

Glossaries are handled by the integrated terminology module. Glossaries can be imported in TMX or delimited text formats and exported as delimited text or MultiTerm XML. Glossaries can include two or more languages or language variants. Term matching with glossary entries can be based on many different parameters, taking into consideration capitalization, partial or fuzzy matches and other factors. Terms to be avoided can be marked as "forbidden" in the properties of a particular glossary entry.

Integration of machine translation and postediting 

memoQ has integrated machine translation and postediting into its translation workflow. With the selection of appropriate conditions and a plug-in for machine translation, machine-generated translation units (TUs) will be inserted if no match is found in an active translation memory. The translator can then post-edit the machine translation in the attempt to make sense of it. memoQ includes plug-ins which support several MT systems. Other MT systems can be integrated via the application programming interface (API).

Interoperability with other CAT tools 

The designers of memoQ have followed a fairly consistent policy of interoperability or functional compatibility with similar software tools or processes involving translation by other means through both the implementation of standards such as XLIFF and TMX, handling proprietary formats of other translation-support tools and providing exchange formats easily handled in other environments.

Implementation of standards 
Like many other translation environment tools, memoQ implements some standards, both official and de facto, for sharing translation files and reference information.
These include: XLIFF, XLIFF:doc and TMX for translation files; TMX and delimited text (not a standard, but a common format) for translation memory data import, TMX for export; and TBX, TMX, XML and delimited text for terminology import, XML and delimited text for export.

Proprietary format support 
Proprietary formats for other environments which are supported to various extents include Star Transit project packages (PXF, PPF), SDL Trados Studio (SDLPPX, SDLXLIFF), older Trados formats (TTX, bilingual DOC/RTF) and Wordfast Pro (TXML). In the case of project package formats, translation file and translation memory exchange generally work well, but other package information such as terminology or settings data may not be transferable. With translation file formats there are also some limitations associated with particular elements, such as footnote structures in bilingual DOC/RTF files from Wordfast or Trados Workbench.
Terminology export also supports a configuration of the proprietary XML definition used by SDL MultiTerm.

Exchange formats 
memoQ supports a number of bilingual exchange formats for review and translation:
 XLIFF for work in other environments, with proprietary (optional) extensions to provide additional information to users of the same software
 a simplified "bilingual DOC" format substantially compatible with the old Trados Workbench and Wordfast Classic formatting. However, these files are sensitive to corruption if strict limits on using them are not observed.
 a robust bilingual RTF table format, which is used in many ways for review, translation or providing feedback by filtering comments made by translators or reviewers. This format simplifies the involvement of those who do not work with computer-assisted translation tools, as translation or review of a text or comments can be performed in any word processor capable of reading an RTF file. This approach was introduced originally by Atril's Déjà Vu and has been adopted in various ways by many other environments over the years.

References

External links 
 Web site of memoQ software

Translation software
Machine translation
Natural language processing software